Dhaka Warriors was one of the nine teams played in the 2008 competition of the defunct Indian Cricket League (ICL). The captain was former Bangladeshi captain and batsman Habibul Bashar. The Dhaka Warriors was solely composed of Bangladeshi players and was only the second team in the competition to be represented by players from a single country. The team was formed in 2008 by a group of Bangladeshis who severed links with the Bangladesh Cricket Board; of the 14 players who made up the first squad, 12 had represented Bangladesh at international level. The Dhaka Warrior players received bans.

History
On 16 September 2008, the Dhaka Warriors team was the ninth team to join the Indian Cricket League. The team consists of 13 Bangladeshi cricketers. The players all received 10-year bans from the Bangladesh Cricket Board (BCB) for joining the league which is not authorised by the International Cricket Council. Balwinder Sandhu, a former Indian all-rounder coaches the team which will play in the second season on the league, beginning on 10 October 2008. The team will represent Bangladesh in the ICL World Series which follows the league.

The exodus of 14 players was controversial, leading to some Bangladeshi fans labelling the players "traitors". Banning the players significantly weakened Bangladesh's batting line up as Shahriar Nafees, Aftab Ahmed, and Alok Kapali have all represented Bangladesh at international level shortly before joining the ICL. Habibul Bashar, the captain of the new side and Bangladesh's leading Test run scorer, still had ambition to play for the national side again while Nazimuddin, Tapash Baisya, Manjural Islam, Mohammad Sharif, Dhiman Ghosh, Mosharraf Hossain, and Mahbubul Karim all have international experience. Mahbubul Karim and Golam Mabud, the only players in the squad not to have represented Bangladesh in internationals, were from the Bangladesh Academy team and the national side's reserve wicket-keeper respectively. Bashar, Aftab, Reza, Ghosh and Mosharraf retired from international cricket.

Inaugural tournament

The Dhaka Warriors lost their inaugural match in the ICL in the round-robin stage of the tournament, to the Chennai Superstars by six wickets on 11 October 2008. Although the team went on to lose their next match, which was against the Hyderabad Heroes on 15 October, by four wickets, the game was notable for Alok Kapali scoring 100 from only 60 balls. Not only was it the first century scored by the team, but it was the first century in the history of the tournament. The Dhaka Warrior's first victory came against the Delhi Giants on 20 October. The win, by 62 runs, was the biggest of the tournament. Dhaka lost their next game on 25 October, against the Royal Bengal Tigers by eight wickets.

The team recorded its second win of the tournament on 27 October, beating the Mumbai Champs by six wickets. The match was seen as a must win for the Dhaka Warriors to qualify for the semi-finals of the competition. This was the first of a three-match winning run which saw the Dhaka Warriors rise from the bottom part of the table to second place. They won their next match on 31 October against the Chandigarh Lions by eight wickets. The third in the hat-trick of wins was against the Ahmedabad Rockets by 13 runs on 3 November. Dhaka lost their last league match, against Lahore Badshahs, on 7 November by five wickets. Lahore Badshahs went on to secure the fourth semi-final place and the Dhaka Warriors finished in fifth place.

Former squad
Players with international caps are listed in bold.

Previous performance
The Dhaka Warriors were not formed until the second season of the ICL, so were unable to participate in tournaments before 2008.

References

Indian Cricket League teams
Cricket clubs established in 2008
Former senior cricket clubs of India
2008 establishments in Bangladesh